Jane Pope (1744 – 30 July 1818) was an English actress.

Life
Pope was the daughter William and Susanna Pope. Her father was a London theatrical wig-maker for the Theatre Royal, Drury Lane. (There has been confusion over her date of birth with different authorities giving 1742 and 1744, but in a letter from Jane Pope of 1808 she states her age as 64.) Pope had three brothers and she spent her life living with her sister who was named after their mother. Neither of them married.

As a child Pope and her brother were recruited as child extras for a Lilliputian production for Garrick in 1756. From this she speedily developed into soubrette roles. Pope had a dispute with Garrick over whether she was worth eight or ten pounds a week. She left his company but returned when he offered to reemploy her and Pope agreed to eight pounds. She was Mrs Candour in The School for Scandal at its first presentation (1777). There is a painting of Jane Pope by James Roberts in the role of Mrs Page in the Merry Wives of Windsor. She played Mrs Page at Drury Lane in several performances in February to April 1778.

Pope was a lifelong friend of Mrs Clive, and erected the monument at Twickenham to the latter's memory. She retired from the professional stage at a special performance at Drury Lane on 26 May 1808. She was an admirable actress and was praised by all the literary critics of her day unused to such a combination.

Selected roles
 Lady Flutter in The Discovery by Frances Sheridan (1763)
 Mrs Candour in The School for Scandal by Richard Brinsley Sheridan (1777)
 Miss Phoebe Latimer in The Natural Son by Richard Cumberland (1784)
 Mrs Alscrip in The Heiress by John Burgoyne (1786)
 Mrs Modely in Seduction by Thomas Holcroft (1787)
 Mrs Dorothy in The Impostors by Richard Cumberland (1789)
 Mrs Dorville in The German Hotel by Thomas Holcroft (1790)
 Lady Fancourt in Love's Frailties by Thomas Holcroft (1794)
 Lady Horatia Horton in The Town Before You by Hannah Cowley (1794)
 Lady Anne in The Deserted Daughter by Thomas Holcroft (1795)
 Lady Plinlimmon in The Welsh Heiress by Edward Jerningham (1795)
 Mrs Wrangle in First Love by Richard Cumberland (1795)
 Lady Taunton in The Man of Ten Thousand by Thomas Holcroft (1796)
 Ellen in A Cure for the Heart Ache by Thomas Morton (1797)
 Lady Manfred in The Last of the Family by Richard Cumberland (1797)
 Lady Ferment in Knave or Not? by Thomas Holcroft (1798)
 Maria in He's Much to Blame  by Thomas Holcroft (1798)
 Constantia in The Eccentric Lover by Richard Cumberland (1798)
 Lady Truckle in A Word for Nature by Richard Cumberland (1798)
 Lady Julia in Five Thousand a Year by Thomas John Dibdin (1799)
 Julia Cleveland in The Votary of Wealth by Joseph George Holman (1799)
 Victoria in Indiscretion by Prince Hoare (1800)
 Caroline in Hear Both Sides by Thomas Holcroft (1803)

References

English stage actresses
1744 births
1818 deaths
18th-century English actresses
19th-century English actresses
Actresses from London